Knut Reese Larsen is a Norwegian handball player.

He made his debut on the Norwegian national team in 1957, 
and played 31 matches for the national team between 1957 and 1964. He participated at the 1958 and 1961 World Men's Handball Championship.

References

Year of birth missing (living people)
Living people
Norwegian male handball players